Blood of Bacchus is the third studio album by gothic/doom metal band, Ava Inferi. It was released on Season of Mist, on 25 May 2009.

Track listing 
 "Truce" – 3:29
 "Last Sign of Summer" – 6:45
 "Colours of the Dark" – 7:03
 "Black Wings" – 2:14
 "Appeler les Loups" – 9:22
 "Be Damned" – 7:39
 "Tempestade" – 7:22
 "Blood of Bacchus" – 6:19
 "Memoirs" – 3:47

Personnel 
 Carmen Susana Simões — vocals
 Rune Eriksen - electric and clean guitars, effects
 Jaime S. Ferreira - bass
 João Samora - drums, percussion

Guest appearances 
 Kristoffer Rygg -  Vocals
 Live Julianne Kostøl - Cello
 Arne Martinussen - Piano
 Fredrik Söderlind

References 

Ava Inferi albums
2009 albums
Season of Mist albums